Norma Beatriz Nolan (born 22 April 1938) is an Argentine beauty queen who was the first woman from Argentina to win the Miss Universe title. Nolan is of Irish and Italian descent. She was crowned Miss Argentina in 1962 by her predecessor, Adriana Gardiazábal, who was the second runner-up in the previous pageant.

See also
Miss Universe 1962
List of Argentines

References

External links
Abc.gov.ar (In Spanish)

1938 births
Argentine beauty pageant winners
Argentine female models
Argentine people of Irish descent
Argentine people of Italian descent
Living people
Miss Universe 1962 contestants
Miss Universe winners